Blood Arrow is a 1958 American Western film directed by Charles Marquis Warren and written by Fred Freiberger. The film stars Scott Brady, Paul Richards, Phyllis Coates, Don Haggerty, Diana Darrin and Jeanne Bates. The film was released on April 1, 1958, by 20th Century Fox.

Plot

Bess Johnson, newly arrived in a Mormon settlement in Wyoming Territory, is having difficulty getting a shipment of smallpox vaccine delivered. In her way are Little Otter, a chief of the Blackfeet who wishes death to all whites in the territory, and Brill, a gambler who is interested in both Bess and a secret gold mine the Mormons might be hiding.

Dan Kree, a gunfighter, happens by on his way to Oregon and gives aid to Bess, who in turn saves him from a lethal snake bite. The mine turns out to be real, but Little Otter is killed and Dan gets the better of Brill. He leaves, but tells Bess he could be back.

Cast 
Scott Brady as Dan Kree
Paul Richards as Brill
Phyllis Coates as Bess Johnson
Don Haggerty as Gabe
Diana Darrin as Lennie
Jeanne Bates as Almee
Rocky Shahan as Taslatch
John Dierkes as Ez
Richard Gilden as Little Otter
Patrick O'Moore as McKenzie 
Des Slattery as Ceppi
William McGraw as Norm

References

External links 
 

1958 films
20th Century Fox films
American Western (genre) films
1958 Western (genre) films
Films directed by Charles Marquis Warren
Films scored by Raoul Kraushaar
1950s English-language films
1950s American films